The Chimera ( or ), also Chimaera (Chimæra) (Ancient Greek: , Chímaira means 'she-goat'), according to Greek mythology, was a monstrous fire-breathing hybrid creature, composed of different animal parts from Lycia, Asia Minor. It is usually depicted as a lion, with the head of a goat protruding from its back, and a tail that might end with a snake's head. It was an offspring of Typhon and Echidna and a sibling of monsters like Cerberus and the Lernaean Hydra.

The term "chimera" has come to describe any mythical or fictional creature with parts taken from various animals, to describe anything composed of disparate parts or perceived as wildly imaginative, implausible, or dazzling.

Family

According to Hesiod, the Chimera's mother was a certain ambiguous "she", which may refer to Echidna, in which case the father would presumably be Typhon, though possibly (unlikely) the Hydra or even Ceto was meant instead. However, the mythographers Apollodorus (citing Hesiod as his source) and Hyginus both make the Chimera the offspring of Echidna and Typhon. Hesiod also has the Sphinx and the Nemean lion as the offspring of Orthus, and another ambiguous "she", often understood as probably referring to the Chimera, although possibly instead to Echidna, or again even Ceto.

Description

Homer described the Chimera in the Iliad, saying that "she was of divine stock not of men, in the fore part a lion, in the hinder a serpent, and in the midst a goat, breathing forth in terrible wise the might of blazing fire." Hesiod and Apollo Dorus gave similar descriptions: a three-headed creature with a lion in front, a fire-breathing goat in the middle, and a serpent in the rear.

Killed by Bellerophon

According to Homer, the Chimera, who was reared by Araisodarus (the father of Atymnius and Maris, Trojan warriors killed by Nestor's sons Antilochus and Trasymedes), was "a bane to many men". As told in the Iliad, the hero Bellerophon was ordered by the king of Lycia to slay the Chimera (hoping the monster would kill Bellerophon). Still, the hero, "trusting in the signs of the gods", succeeded in killing the Chimera. Hesiod adds that Bellerophon had help in killing the Chimera, saying, "her did Pegasus and noble Bellerophon slay". 

Apollo Dorus gave a more complete account of the story. Iobates, the king of Lycia, had ordered Bellerophon to kill the Chimera (who had been killing cattle and had "devastated the country") since he thought that the Chimera would instead kill Bellerophon, "for it was more than a match for many, let alone one". But the hero mounted his winged horse Pegasus (which had sprung from the blood of the Medusa) "and soaring on high shot down the Chimera from the height."

Iconography

Although the Chimera was, according to Homer, situated in foreign Lycia, her representation in the arts was wholly Greek. An autonomous tradition that did not rely on the written word was represented in the visual repertory of the Greek vase painters. The Chimera first appeared early in the repertory of the proto-Corinthian pottery painters, providing some of the earliest identifiable mythological scenes that may be recognized in Greek art. After some early hesitation, the Corinthian type was fixed in the 670s BC; the variations in the pictorial representations suggest multiple origins to Marilyn Low Schmitt.[ The fascination with the monstrous devolved by the end of the seventh century into a decorative Chimera motif in Corinth, while the motif of Bellerophon on Pegasus took on a separate existence alone. A separate Attic tradition, where the goats breathe fire and the animal's rear is serpentine, begins with the  confidence that Marilyn Low Schmitt is convinced that there must be unrecognized or undiscovered local precursors. Two vase painters employed the motif so consistently they were given the pseudonyms the Bellerophon Painter and the Chimaera Painter.

Similar creatures

A fire-breathing lioness was one of the earliest solar and war deities in Ancient Egypt (representations from 3000 years prior to the Greeks), and influences are feasible. The lioness represented the war goddess and protector of both cultures that would unite as Ancient Egypt. Sekhmet was one of the dominant deities in upper Egypt and Bast in lower Egypt. As the divine mother, and more especially as protector, for Lower Egypt, Bast became strongly associated with Wadjet, the patron goddess of Lower Egypt.

In Etruscan civilization, the Chimera appears in the Orientalizing period that precedes Etruscan Archaic art. The Chimera appears in Etruscan wall paintings of the fourth century BC.

In Indus civilization are pictures of the Chimera in many seals. There are different kinds of Chimera composed of animals from the Indian subcontinent. It is not known what the Indus people called the Chimera. 

Although the Chimera of antiquity was forgotten in Medieval art, chimerical figures appear as embodiments of the deceptive, even satanic forces of raw nature. They were depicted with a human face and a scaly tail, as in Dante's vision of Geryon in Inferno xvii.7–17, 25–27, hybrid monsters, more akin to the Manticore of Pliny's Natural History (viii.90), provided iconic representations of hypocrisy and fraud well into the seventeenth century through a symbolic representation in Cesare Ripa's Iconological.

Classical sources
The myths of the Chimera may be found in the Bibliotheca of Pseudo-Apollodorus (book 1), the Iliad (book 16) by Homer, the Fabulae 57 and 151 by Hyginus, the Metamorphoses (book VI 339 by Ovid; IX 648), and the Theogony 319ff by Hesiod.

Virgil, in the Aeneid (book 5) employs Chimaera for the name of a gigantic ship of Gyas in the ship-race, with possible allegorical significance in contemporary Roman politics.

Hypothesis about origin 

Pliny the Elder cited Ctesias and quoted Photius identifying the Chimera with an area of permanent gas vents that still may be found by hikers on the Lycian Way in southwest Turkey. Called in Turkish, Yanartaş (flaming rock), the area contains some two dozen vents in the ground, grouped in two patches on the hillside above the Temple of Hephaestus approximately 3 km north of Çıralı, near ancient Olympos, in Lycia. The vents emit burning methane thought to be of metamorphic origin. The fires of these were landmarks in ancient times and were used for navigation by sailors.

The Neo-Hittite Chimera from Carchemish, dated 850–750 BC, which is now housed in the Museum of Anatolian Civilizations, is believed to be a basis for the Greek legend. It differs, however, from the Greek version in that a winged body of a lioness also has a human head rising from her shoulders.

Use for Chinese mythological creatures

Some western scholars of Chinese art, starting with Victor Segalen, use the word "chimera" generically to refer to winged leonine or mixed species quadrupeds, such as bixie, tianlu, and even qilin.

In popular culture

See also
 
 Grotesque (architecture)
 Anzû (older reading: Zû), a Mesopotamian monster
 The Beast in Christianity eschatology
 Chimera of Arezzo
 Chimaera, genus of fish named after the mythical creature
 Dābbat al-Arḍ in Islamic eschatology
 Dragon, a reptilian monster sharing similar hybrid, flying and fire-breathing traits
 Garuda, a mythical creature and Demigod from Indian sub-continent
 Griffin a.k.a. griffon or gryphon, a lion/eagle hybrid
 Hybrid creatures in mythology
 Kotobuki, a Japanese Chimera with the parts of the animals on the Chinese Zodiac.
 Lamassu, an Assyrian deity described to be bull/lion/eagle/human hybrid
 List of hybrid creatures in folklore
 Manticore, a mythical creature with a human head, a lion body, a scorpion tail, spines like a porcupine, and bat wings in some iterations
 Nue, a Japanese Chimera with the head of a monkey, the body of a tanuki, the legs of a tiger, and a snake-headed tail
 Pegasus, a winged stallion in Greek mythology
 Pixiu or Pi Yao, Chinese mythical creature
 Snallygaster, a mythical creature with metal beak, reptilian body, bird-like wings and octopus tentacles
 Sphinx, a mythical creature with a woman's head and breasts, lion's body and eagle's wings
 Simurgh, an Iranian mythical flying creature
 Ziz, a giant griffin-like bird in Jewish mythology

Notes

References
 Apollodorus, Apollodorus, The Library, with an English Translation by Sir James George Frazer, F.B.A., F.R.S. in 2 Volumes. Cambridge, Massachusetts, Harvard University Press; London, William Heinemann Ltd. 1921. Online version at the Perseus Digital Library.
 Caldwell, Richard, Hesiod's Theogony, Focus Publishing/R. Pullins Company (June 1, 1987). .
 Clay, Jenny Strauss, Hesiod's Cosmos,  Cambridge University Press, 2003. .
 Gantz, Timothy, Early Greek Myth: A Guide to Literary and Artistic Sources, Johns Hopkins University Press, 1996, Two volumes:  (Vol. 1),  (Vol. 2).
 Hard, Robin, The Routledge Handbook of Greek Mythology: Based on H.J. Rose's "Handbook of Greek Mythology", Psychology Press, 2004, . Google Books.
 Hesiod, Theogony, in The Homeric Hymns and Homerica with an English Translation by Hugh G. Evelyn-White, Cambridge, Massachusetts, Harvard University Press; London, William Heinemann Ltd. 1914. Online version at the Perseus Digital Library.
 Homer, The Iliad with an English Translation by A.T. Murray, Ph.D. in two volumes. Cambridge, Massachusetts, Harvard University Press; London, William Heinemann, Ltd. 1924. Online version at the Perseus Digital Library.
 Hyginus, Gaius Julius, Fabulae in Apollodorus' Library and Hyginus' Fabulae: Two Handbooks of Greek Mythology, Translated, with Introductions by R. Scott Smith and Stephen M. Trzaskoma, Hackett Publishing Company,  2007. .
 Most, G.W., Hesiod, Theogony, Works and Days, Testimonia, Edited and translated by Glenn W. Most, Loeb Classical Library No. 57, Cambridge, Massachusetts, Harvard University Press, 2018. . Online version at Harvard University Press.
 Peck, Harry Thurston, 1898. Harpers Dictionary of Classical Antiquities: "Chimaera"
 West, M. L., Hesiod: Theogony, Oxford University Press.

External links

Theoi Project: Khimaira
Harappan Chimaeras as 'Symbolic Hypertexts'. Some Thoughts on Plato, Chimaera and the Indus Civilization

Mythological hybrids
Monsters in Greek mythology
Legendary mammals
Mythological lions
Corinthian mythology
Mythological caprids
Legendary serpents
Pegasus
Mythical many-headed creatures
Fire-breathing monsters